Herman Layne (February 13, 1901 – August 27, 1973) was an outfielder in Major League Baseball. He played for the Pittsburgh Pirates in 1927.
He was married to the late Norene (Fisher) Layne and had one daughter, Enid Adams, one grandson, Bruce Adams and two great-grandchildren Michael and Lori.

References

External links

1901 births
1973 deaths
Major League Baseball outfielders
Pittsburgh Pirates players
Baseball players from West Virginia